Frolovo is a rural locality (a village) in Chuchkovskoye Rural Settlement, Sokolsky District, Vologda Oblast, Russia. The population was 2 as of 2002.

Geography 
Frolovo is located 86 km northeast of Sokol (the district's administrative centre) by road. Andreyevskoye is the nearest rural locality.

References 

Rural localities in Sokolsky District, Vologda Oblast